Rajya Sabha elections were held in 1954, to elect members of the Rajya Sabha, Indian Parliament's upper chamber.

Elections
Elections were held in 1954 to elect members from various states.
The list is incomplete.

Members elected
The following members are elected in the elections held in 1954. They are members for the term 1952-54 by luck as decided in 1952 and retire in year 1954, except in case of the resignation or death before the term.

State - Member - Party

Bye-elections
The following bye elections were held in the year 1954.

 Andhra - B V Gurumoorthy - INC ( elec 15/02/1954 term till 1956 )
 Bombay - Narayan K Daga - INC ( elec  23/04/1954 term till 1958 )
 West Bengal - Mriganka M Sur - INC ( elec  13/09/1954 term till 1960 )

References

1954 elections in India
1954